The tripartite motif family (TRIM) is a protein family.

Function
Many TRIM proteins are induced by interferons, which are important component of resistance to pathogens and  several TRIM proteins are known to be required for the restriction of infection by lentiviruses. TRIM proteins are involved in pathogen-recognition and by regulation of transcriptional pathways in host defence.

Structure
The tripartite motif is always present at the N-terminus of the TRIM proteins. The TRIM motif includes the following three domains:

 (1) a RING finger domain
 (2) one or two B-box zinc finger domains
 when only one B-box is present, it is always a type-2 B-box
 when two B-boxes are present the type-1 B-Box always precedes the type-2 B-Box
 (3) coiled coil region

The C-terminus of TRIM proteins contain either:
 Group 1 proteins: a C-terminal domain selected from the following list:
 NHL and IGFLMN domains, either in association or alone
 PHD domain associated with a bromodomain
 MATH domain (in e.g., TRIM37)
 ARF domain (in e.g., TRIM23)
  EXOIII domain (in e.g., TRIM19) or
 Group 2 proteins: a SPRY C-terminal domain
e.g. TRIM21

Family members
The TRIM family is split into two groups that differ in domain structure and genomic organization:

 Group 1 members possess a variety of C-terminal domains, and are represented in both vertebrate  and invertebrates
 Group 2 is absent in invertebrates, possess a C-terminal SPRY domain

Members of the family include:

 Group 1
 PHD-BROMO domain containing: TRIM24 (TIF1α), TRIM28 (TIF1β), TRIM33 (TIF1γ)–  act as corepressors
   1-10:   TRIM1, TRIM2, TRIM3,  TRIM8, TRIM9
 11-20: TRIM12, TRIM13, TRIM14, TRIM16, TRIM18, TRIM19
 21-30: TRIM23, TRIM25,  TRIM29, TRIM30
 31-40:  TRIM32, TRIM36, TRIM37
 41-50:  TRIM42, TRIM44, TRIM45, TRIM46, TRIM47
 51-60: TRIM51, TRIM53, TRIM54, TRIM55, TRIM56, TRIM57, TRIM59
 61-70:  TRIM62, TRIM63, TRIM65, TRIM66, TRIM67, TRIM69, TRIM70
 71-75: TRIM71
 Group 2
  1-10: TRIM4, TRIM5, TRIM6, TRIM7, TRIM10
 11-20: TRIM11, TRIM12, TRIM15, TRIM17, TRIM20
 21-30: TRIM21, TRIM22, TRIM26, TRIM27, TRIM30
 31-40: TRIM31, TRIM34, TRIM35, TRIM38, TRIM39, TRIM40
 41-50: TRIM41, TRIM43, TRIM48, TRIM49, TRIM50
 51-60: TRIM51, TRIM52, TRIM53, TRIM57, TRIM58, TRIM60
 61-70: TRIM61, TRIM64, TRIM68, TRIM69, TRIM70
 71-75: TRIM72, TRIM73, TRIM74, TRIM75

References

Gene expression
Transcription coregulators